The Roman Catholic Archdiocese of Capiz is an ecclesiastical territory or diocese of the Catholic Church in the Philippines. The archdiocese covers the entire province of Capiz on the island of Panay in the Visayas, central Philippines, and has its see in Roxas City.

Following the installation of Cardinal Jose Advincula as Archbishop of Manila, Cyril Villareal, Vicar General of the archdiocese, was elected as Archdiocesan Administrator on June 28, 2021.

On March 3, 2023, Pope Francis appointed incumbent Baguio Bishop Victor Bendico as archbishop of Capiz. No date has been set yet for his installation.

History
The Diocese of Capiz was carved from the territory of the Archdiocese of Jaro on 27 January 1951, and covered the whole civil provinces of Capiz (which included Aklan until 1956) and Romblon.

Two dioceses were eventually created from its territory: the Diocese of Romblon (19 December 1974) and the Diocese of Kalibo (17 January 1976).

On 17 January 1976, Pope Paul VI elevated the bishopric to the rank of an archdiocese through his Papal Bull Nimium Patens which turned it into an ecclesiastical province. The dioceses of Romblon and Kalibo became its suffragans.

The archdiocese retained the name Capiz since its establishment predates the renaming of the municipality where it sits into Roxas City (11 April 1951).

Coat of Arms
The silver crescent on the blue background symbolizes the Immaculate Conception, titular of the cathedral. The twins (kapid in Visayan) suggest the name of the territory of the diocese, the province of Capiz. The gold background indicates the unique honor accruing to the province from the fact that the highest men in Church and State at the time when the Philippines became a republic were both from Capiz: the Gabriel M. Reyes then-Archbishop of Manila and Manuel Roxas, the first President of the Third Philippine Republic. Hence, the twin at the dexter side holds a patriarchal cross, insignia of an archbishop, while the one at the sinister side holds a sheathed ancient ceremonial sword of command.

Suffragan dioceses
 Diocese of Romblon
 Diocese of Kalibo

Gallery

List of Ordinaries

Bishops of Capiz

Archbishops of Capiz

Affiliated bishops
Gabriel M. Reyes, parish priest of Capiz (1918-1920); archbishop of Cebu (1934-1949); Archbishop of Manila (1949-1952)
Jaime Sin, first rector of St. Pius X Seminary (1957-1967); archbishop of Jaro (1972-1974); archbishop of Manila (1974-2003)
Warlito I. Cajandig, appointed vicar apostolic of Calapan in 1989
Vicente Navarra, first bishop of Kabankalan (1987-2001); bishop of Bacolod (2001-2016)
Victor B. Bendico, appointed bishop of Baguio in 2017
Midyphil Billones, appointed auxiliary bishop of Cebu in 2019
Jose Advincula, bishop of San Carlos (2001-2011); archbishop of Capiz (2011–2021); appointed archbishop of Manila in 2021

Administered Schools
St. Pius X Seminary (Roxas City)
Sancta Maria, Mater et Regina, Seminarium (Roxas City)
Colegio De La Purisima Concepcion

See also
Christianity in the Philippines
List of Catholic dioceses in the Philippines
Panay Church

References

Catholic Hierarchy
CBCP

Capiz
Archdiocese
Christian organizations established in 1951
Roman Catholic dioceses and prelatures established in the 20th century
Religion in Capiz
Roxas City
1951 establishments in the Philippines